William J. Cooper Jr. (born October 22, 1940) is an American historian who specializes in the history of the American South, and is regarded as a leading expert on the life of Jefferson Davis.

Life and career
Cooper studied at Princeton University and Johns Hopkins University. After two years of service as an officer in the U.S. Army, he went on to spend his entire academic career at Louisiana State University.

Works
 
The Conservative Regime: South Carolina, 1877-1890 (1968)
The South and the Politics of Slavery, 1828-56 (1979)
Liberty and Slavery (1983)
The American South: A History (1996) (with Tom E. Terrill)
Jefferson Davis, American (2000)
Jefferson Davis and the Civil War Era (2008)
We Have the War Upon Us: The Onset of the Civil War, November 1860-April 1861 (2012)
The Lost Founding Father: John Quincy Adams and the Transformation of American Politics (2017)
Approaching Civil War and Southern History (2019)

References

External links

Living people
1940 births
American historians
Princeton University alumni
Johns Hopkins University alumni
Louisiana State University faculty
Historians of the Southern United States
People from Kingstree, South Carolina